Julie Ferguson (born 1977) is a former New Zealand rugby sevens player. She represented New Zealand at the 2009 Rugby World Cup Sevens in Dubai.

References 

1977 births
Living people
New Zealand female rugby union players
New Zealand female rugby sevens players
New Zealand women's international rugby sevens players